Carsten Glud (born 14 June 1970) is a Danish lightweight rower. He won a gold medal at the 1995 World Rowing Championships in Tampere with the lightweight men's eight.

References

1970 births
Living people
Danish male rowers
World Rowing Championships medalists for Denmark